Khongsang railway station is a railway station in Tamenglong district, Manipur about 106 kms from capital Imphal by road. Its code is KGBP. It serves Khongsang village of Nungba sub-division of Tamenglong District. The station includes two platforms. The first train engine reached the Khongsang station on March 14, 2022. The first Goods Train reached Khongsang station on March 28, 2022. On October 13, 2022 President of India flagged off first passenger train from Agartala to Khaongsang.
Presently two trains terminates and originates from Khongsang Railway Station, 12097/12098 Agartala Khongsang Jan Shatabdi Express and 05659/05660 Silchar Khongsang Passenger Special.

This station is a part of Jiribam–Imphal railway line Project.

References

Railway stations in Imphal East district
Lumding railway division
Proposed railway stations in India

The train will commence its regular journey from October 14  ..

Read more at:
http://timesofindia.indiatimes.com/articleshow/94800380.cms